Haeska may refer to several places in Estonia:

Haeska, Lääne County, village in Ridala Parish, Lääne County
Haeska, Saare County, village in Pihtla Parish, Saare County